POSH (also Romanized Fosh, an abbreviation for Plugot Sadeh, lit. Field Companies) was an elite Jewish strike force that served as the commando arm of the Haganah during the 1936–1939 Arab revolt in Palestine when the country was under British Mandate control. 

POSH members were hand-picked by Yitzhak Sadeh, commander of the Jewish Settlement Police. 

By March 1938, POSH had 1,500 trained fighters divided into 13 regional groups. They were armed with  British SMLEs, grenades, rifles and some small arms, and operated in swift raids under Charles Orde Wingate's Special Night Squads, taking full advantage of their mobility. 

POSH was disbanded in 1939 to create a larger force known as the Hish (Heil Sadeh, "Field Corps"). During World War II POSH veterans were trained by the British for commando night raids.

References

Further reading
 Katz, Sam (1988). Israeli Elite Units Since 1948. Osprey Publishing.
 Oring, Elliott (1981). Israeli Humor: The Content and Structure of the Chizbat of the Palmah. SUNY Press. 

Haganah units